Forshaga Idrottsförening is a Swedish sports club, founded in 1907, and based in Forshaga, Värmland. The club plays both ice hockey and association football.  The football club's A-team plays in Division 4 Värmland .  The ice hockey team historically has been more successful, having played 12 seasons in Division 1 when it was the top tier of Swedish ice hockey.  IIHF Hall of Fame members Nils Nilsson and Ulf Sterner played for the Forshaga. The hockey club's A-team currently plays in group E of Division 1, the third tier of ice hockey in Sweden.

References

External links
 Forshaga IF Football's official website
 Forshaga IF Hockey's official website
 Hockey team's profile on Eliteprospects.com

Ice hockey teams in Sweden
Ice hockey teams in Värmland County